Randolph Stone (February 26, 1890 – December 9, 1981) was an Austrian-American chiropractor, osteopath and naturopath who founded polarity therapy, a technique of alternative medicine. He had an interest in philosophy and religions, and encountered Ayurvedic philosophy on a trip to India. His background in chiropractic was shaped by his studies of various Eastern concepts of energy medicine, including Ayurveda, traditional Chinese medicine, yoga, and reflexology.

Life and work 
Stone was born Rudolph Bautsch in 1890 in Austria. He immigrated with his family to the United States in 1898 and changed his name to Randolf Stone in the 1920s. During that period he began studying several different practices and became qualified in chiropractic. Dissatisfied with Western approaches, he also began traveling and studying non-Western medical practices. He first published his concepts of polarity therapy in 1947 in a book entitled Energy, and then published a series of books and pamphlets to explain his ideas and methods. He had concluded that an observable (yet undetectable to mainstream scientific methods) 'electromagnetic polarity' was a reflection of health. He held the opinion that this energy was influenced by touch, diet, movement, sound, attitude, relationships and by environmental factors.

He had a successful private practice in Chicago and he also worked for about 10 years in a clinic in India. Stone was initiated into the Radha Soami Satsang Beas tradition under Baba Sawan Singh in 1945 and in 1956 published his Mystical Bible, a Radha Soami interpretation of verses from the Bible. Stone spent the last eight years of his life with his niece Louise Hilger in a house at the Radha Soami center in Beas, India. He died there in 1981.

Stone's ideas have been dismissed by medical health experts as quackery or untestable. They have also been criticized as a discredited form of vitalism. According to Nancy Allison in The Illustrated Encyclopedia of Body-Mind Disciplines, even advocates of Stone's theory consider his books Health Building and Polarity Therapy to be difficult reading due to their inconsistencies and ambiguities. His ideas are thus interpreted widely, and polarity therapists vary in their approaches.  His ideas were later popularized by Pierre Pannetier, a naturopath who had studied under Stone. There are many polarity associations around the world.

References 

1890 births
1981 deaths
19th-century philosophers
20th-century Austrian philosophers
American chiropractors
American osteopaths
Austrian spiritual writers
Austro-Hungarian people
Austrian Theosophists
Naturopaths